Suvasvesi is a lake in Eastern Finland near the town of Kuopio. Suvasvesi consists of two circular open lakes, Kuukkarinselkä in north and Haapaselkä in south. The lakes are separated by a group of islands. The lake has 688 islands  in total. The area of the lake is  making it the 18th largest lake in Finland.

In 2001, shatter cones were found in Kuukkarinselkä making it the 6th known impact crater in Finland. Its age is estimated to be about 85 Ma but the Earth Impact Database (EID) gives a broader span of less than 1000 Ma.

Haapaselkä resembles the northern counterpart and it was also suspected to be an impact crater. It has recently been confirmed and is usually referred as Suvasvesi South crater. It is similar in size, and the age of the crater is estimated to be older than 700 Ma (probably about 710–720 Ma) based on argon-argon dating of impact melt rocks found near the southeastern shore of Lake Haapaselkä but EID gives it as around 250 Ma.

See also
Impact craters in Finland

References

External links

Suvasvesi N and S impact structures

Impact craters of Finland
LSuvasvesi
Proterozoic impact craters
Triassic impact craters
Lakes of Kuopio
Lakes of Leppävirta
Impact crater lakes